"Hell (You've Put Me Through)" is a song by Australian singer-songwriter Stephen Cummings and released in November 1990 as the lead single from Cummings' fifth studio album Good Humour. The song peaked at number 33 on the Australia ARIA Charts in February 1991.

At the ARIA Music Awards of 1991, the song earned Cummings a nomination  for ARIA Award for Best Male Artist.

Track listing

Charts

References 

1990 songs
1990 singles
Stephen Cummings songs
Songs written by Stephen Cummings